David Clayton Rogers (born October 21, 1977) is an American actor, writer, and film producer.  He has co-starred in films such as Sublime and Dark Ride. Rogers began his acting career in the made-for-television film Bloody Sunday, followed by an appearance on The WB's Gilmore Girls. In early 2004, he joined the cast of the drama series NY-LON. In 2010, he co-starred in the ABC Family Original Movie Revenge of the Bridesmaids with Joanna Garcia.

Rogers has produced two short films: 2006's Following Abraham and 2009's Skylight, which he also wrote and appeared in.

Personal life
Rogers was born in Atlanta, Georgia, the son of Carolyn Mapp Hewes and E. Paul Rogers Jr., who was the owner and president of the Dorsey Alston Realty Company. On October 19, 2010, he became engaged to actress Sally Pressman. The couple met at Lesly Kahn's Acting Studio. The couple married on September 17, 2011. On October 6, 2012, it was announced they were expecting their first child, who was born in April 2013.

Filmography

Films

Television

References

Living people
1977 births
American male film actors
American male television actors
21st-century American male actors
Male actors from Atlanta